Daniel Edward Wincott (born 19 September 1964) is the Blackwell Law and Society Chair at Cardiff Law School, a position he has held since September 2008.

Education 
Wincott gained his degree from the University of Manchester, and completed his master's there in 1989. He went on to do his doctorate at London School of Economics which he completed in 1999. His thesis was titled The policy configurations of 'welfare statee' and women's role in the workforce in advanced industrial societies.

Career 
Previously, he was based in the Department of Political Science and International Studies at the University of Birmingham. His research interests include European Union law, new institutionalist approaches to political science, devolution and citizenship.

Publications 
His publications include the co-edited book Accountability and Legitimacy in the European Union (Oxford University Press, 2002), and articles in journals including the Journal of Common Market Studies, Political Studies, Journal of European Public Policy, Public Administration, European Law Journal, Publius: The Journal of Federalism, International Political Science Review and Regional & Federal Studies. He is managing editor, along with Charles Lees, of the Journal of Common Market Studies.

References

External links
Homepage at Cardiff Law School

1964 births
Academics of Cardiff University
Academics of the University of Birmingham
Alumni of the London School of Economics
Alumni of the University of Manchester
British political scientists
European Union law scholars
Living people
Place of birth missing (living people)